Sign Here, Here and Here is an EP by American heavy metal band The Company Band.

This is The Company Band's debut recording, it was recorded at Bam Margera's personal studio The Hobbit Hole during 2007.

The CD was mixed by Andrew Alekel at Grandmaster Recorders in Hollywood.

Track listing

Personnel
 Neil Fallon – lead vocals
 James Rota – lead guitar, backing vocals
 Jess Margera – drums
 Dave Bone – guitar
 Jason Diamond – bass

2008 EPs
The Company Band albums